The 2001 World Solar Challenge was one of a biennial series of solar-powered car races, covering about  through the Australian Outback, from Darwin, Northern Territory to Adelaide, South Australia. The winner was a Nuna "Alpha Centauri" car built by Nuon of the Netherlands.

Results

References

Solar car races
Scientific organisations based in Australia
Science competitions
Photovoltaics
Recurring sporting events established in 1987